Dafydd ap Ieuan ab Owen was a 16th-century Welsh poet.

He wrote cywyddau and englynion, some of which associate him with the Harlech area. A number of examples of his work are held by the National Library of Wales.

References 

16th-century Welsh poets
Welsh male poets
Place of birth unknown
Year of birth unknown
Year of death unknown